is a Japanese professional footballer who plays as a defender for Blaublitz Akita.

Career statistics

Club
.

Notes

Honours
 Giravanz Kitakyushu
 J3 League (1): 2019

References

External links

1996 births
Living people
Japanese footballers
Association football defenders
Giravanz Kitakyushu players
Blaublitz Akita players
J2 League players
J3 League players